Grace Ndeezi is a Ugandan female pediatrician and a Professor of Pediatrics and Child Health at Makerere University of Health Sciences with various publications on Nutrition, HIV, Pneumonia, Malaria, Sickle cell anemia, diarrheal diseases, neonatal health and child heath interventions such as immunization, breast feeding and other common childhood diseases.

Grace is also a Fellow of the Uganda National Academy of Sciences (UNAS), holding a PhD from Makerere University and the University of Bergen (joint) with

References

Makerere University alumni
Ugandan women academics
Ugandan pediatricians
Living people
Year of birth missing (living people)
Academic staff of Makerere University